This is the soundtrack to the 2008 thriller Passengers. All original music composed by Edward Shearmur.

Track listing
US edition
 "The Wreckage"
 "Group Therapy"
 "House Call"
 "What Do You Remember?"
 "Norman"
 "At The Museum"
 "Giving Eric The Key"
 "Eric At Midnight"
 "Arkin"
 "Rooftop"
 "Motorcycle Fix"
 "Norman's House"
 "Eric Remembers"
 "Porch"
 "Epiphany"
 "At Peace"
 "End Titles"

References

2008 soundtrack albums
Romance film soundtracks
Thriller film soundtracks